Eugen Gopko (born 5 January 1991 in Kolchyno, Ukrainian SSR) is a Ukrainian-born German professional footballer who plays as a midfielder for TSG Pfeddersheim.

References

External links
 
 
 Eugen Gopko at Fupa

1991 births
Living people
Ukrainian emigrants to Germany
Association football defenders
1. FSV Mainz 05 II players
1. FSV Mainz 05 players
Wormatia Worms players
Bundesliga players
Regionalliga players
Association football midfielders
German footballers
Sportspeople from Zakarpattia Oblast